The Year of the Discovery is a 2020 Spanish documentary film directed by Luis López Carrasco. The documentary focuses on the social protests that took place in Cartagena in 1992, a struggle of the working class in the context of the implementation of industrial restructuring policies that affected thousands of workers in the Region of Murcia after the collapse of companies such as Bazán, Peñarroya and Fesa-Enfersa, dedicated to shipbuilding and chemical and metal industry.

The film won two Goya Awards, Best Documentary Film and Best Editing, out of two nominations at the 35th Goya Awards. At the 8th Feroz Awards, the film won Best Documentary Film, from a total of four nominations.

Reception
The Year of the Discovery received positive reviews from film critics.

Awards

References

External links
 
 

2020 documentary films
Cartagena, Spain
Documentary films about historical events
Documentary films about Spain
Documentary films about the labor movement
Murcian culture
Spanish documentary films
2020s Spanish-language films
Swiss documentary films
1992 in Spain
2020s Spanish films